Ekaterina Ulasevich (born March 3, 1991) is a Russian women's football goalkeeper. She played in the Turkish Women's First Football League for Amed S.K.  in Istanbul with jersey number 91. She appeared in the Russia women's national under-19 football team.

Playing career

Club

Ekaterina Ulasevich played for Zvezda Zvenigorod in the 2009 and 2010 Russian Women's Football Championship. In the 2011/2012 season, she was with Mordovochka Saransk in the 2011/12 season and then with WFC Rossiyanka in 2013. After playing two seasons for Ryazan VDV in 2014 and 2015, she moved to Turkey to join the Istanbul-based Turkish Women's First Football League team Beşiktaş J.K. in the 2016–17 season.
She played for a few matches in the Romanian League in 2018 for champions Olimpia Cluj.
In the 2018–19 Turkish Women's First League, she joined Amed S.K. from Diyarbakır.

International
Ulasevich was a member of the Russia women's national under-19 football team. She played in three matches of the 2009 Kuban Spring Tournament. The same year, she took part at the 2009 UEFA Women's Under-19 Championship Second qualifying round match against Slovakia on 28 April. In 2010, she appeared in three matches of the 2010 Kuban Spring Tournament. She capped in total seven times for the Russia women's U-19 team.

Career statistics
.

Honours
 Turkeish Women's First Football League
Beşiktaş J.K.
 Runners-up (1): 2016–17

References

External links
Ekaterina Ulasevich at UEFA website

Living people
1991 births
Women's association football goalkeepers
Russian women's footballers
Russian expatriate sportspeople in Turkey
Expatriate women's footballers in Turkey
Russian expatriate sportspeople in Romania
Expatriate women's footballers in Romania
WFC Rossiyanka players
Ryazan-VDV players
Beşiktaş J.K. women's football players
Amed S.K. (women) players
FCU Olimpia Cluj players
21st-century Russian women